Chiquito was a United States Army Indian scout and a recipient of the United States military's highest decoration—the Medal of Honor—for his actions in the Indian Wars of the western United States. He was chief of a band of the Pinal Coyotero, and a petty chief of the Apache. 

Chiquito was awarded the Medal of Honor on April 12, 1875 for his "[g]allant conduct during campaigns and engagements with Apaches" in the "winter of 1871-73 [sic]".

Medal of Honor citation
Rank and organization: Indian Scouts. Place and date: Winter of 1871-73. Entered service at: ------. Birth: Arizona. Date of issue: April 12, 1875. 

Citation:

Gallant conduct during campaigns and engagements with Apaches.
In 1980 the star-shaped planchette from Chiquito's Medal of Honor was found in the Arizona desert.

See also

List of Medal of Honor recipients
List of Medal of Honor recipients for the Indian Wars
List of Native American Medal of Honor recipients

References

United States Army Indian Scouts
Native American people of the Indian Wars
United States Army Medal of Honor recipients
Native American United States military personnel
United States Army soldiers
Year of birth unknown
Year of death unknown
Apache Wars
American Indian Wars recipients of the Medal of Honor